The Clay County School District is a public school district in Clay County, Georgia, United States, based in Fort Gaines. It serves the communities of Bluffton and Fort Gaines.

Schools
The Clay County School District has one elementary school and one middle school. In the 2013-2014 school year, a ninth-grade education building was added.  High school aged students attend 10-12th grade in adjoining Randolph County, Georgia.

Elementary school 
Clay County Elementary School

Middle school
Clay County Middle School

Ninth-grade building
Ninth-Grade Academy

References

External links

School districts in Georgia (U.S. state)
Education in Clay County, Georgia